The Flag of Artigas is one of the three official flags of Uruguay. Originally the national flag of the Liga Federal between 1815 and 1820, it was made an official symbol by the Uruguayan state in 1952, and pays homage to political and military leader José Gervasio Artigas, its designer and the national hero of Uruguay. 

It has three horizontal stripes inspired by the Belgrano's Flag, the top and bottom being blue, and the central one white. On top of them, it is crossed by a diagonal red stripe, a symbol of federalism.

In Uruguay, the flag of Artigas must be flown alongside the National Flag and the Flag of the Treinta y Tres near or on government buildings.

History 
It was designed by José Artigas himself based on the flag created in 1812 by Manuel Belgrano, but adding a red stripe to represent federalism. It was the flag of the Liga Federal, a confederation of South American provinces established by Artigas.

Use as military emblems
The Flag of Artigas, and emblems derived from it, have traditionally been used as the symbols of the Military of Uruguay.

Uruguayan Navy
From 1930s to 1990s, warships of the Uruguayan Navy flew the Flag of Artigas as the naval jack, until being replaced by modified pre-1930s design in recent years.

Uruguayan Air Force
The aircraft of the Uruguayan Air Force display the Flag of Artigas on the fins, as well as a circular version of the flag (roundel) on the fuselages and wings.

Uruguayan army and general military use
There is also a different version of the roundel, known as the Artigas' Cockade, which is worn as a cockade on the uniforms of the Military of Uruguay, and also serves as the emblem of the Uruguayan Army. It is likewise based on the Flag of Artigas, but with blue at the centre, surrounded by white then blue, and with the red diagonal stripe overall.

Other flags

The flag of the Argentine province of Entre Ríos, mostly governed by the Federal Party and Justo José Urquiza between 1842 and 1870, is inspired on the flag of Artigas  and looks very similar, except that it has a 9:14 ratio and the blue stripes are much lighter.

References

Flags of Uruguay
José Gervasio Artigas